Broad Street Historic District and variations with Commercial as well as with North, South, East and West may refer to the following places in the United States listed on the National Register of Historic Places:

Arkansas
 East Broad Street Historic District (Texarkana, Arkansas), listed on the NRHP in Miller County, Arkansas

Connecticut
 Broad Street – Davis Park Historic District, Killingly, CT, listed on the NRHP in Connecticut
 Naubuc Avenue-Broad Street Historic District, East Hartford, CT, listed on the NRHP in Hartford County, Connecticut
 Broad Street Historic District (Middletown, Connecticut), listed on the NRHP in Connecticut
 Broad Street Green Historic District, Windsor, CT, listed on the NRHP in Hartford County, Connecticut

Georgia
 Broad Street Historic District (Augusta, Georgia), listed on the NRHP in Georgia
 South Street–Broad Street–Main Street–Laurel Street Historic District, Greensboro, GA, listed on the NRHP in Greene County, Georgia
 Broad Street Historic District (LaGrange, Georgia), listed on the NRHP in Georgia
 North Broad Street Historic District (Monroe, Georgia), listed on the NRHP in Walton County, Georgia
 South Broad Street Historic District (Monroe, Georgia), listed on the NRHP in Walton County, Georgia
 South Broad Street Historic District (Rome, Georgia), listed on the NRHP in Floyd County, Georgia
 Broad Street Commercial Historic District (Winder, Georgia), listed on the NRHP in Barrow County, Georgia
 North Broad Street Residential Historic District, Winder, Georgia, listed on the NRHP in Winder County, Georgia

Maine
 Broad Street Historic District (Bethel, Maine), listed on the NRHP in Oxford County, Maine

Michigan
 Bridge Street-Broad Street Historic District, Linden, Michigan, listed on the NRHP in Genesee County, Michigan

Mississippi
 Broad Street–Church Street Historic District, Columbia, MS, listed on the NRHP in Marion County, Mississippi

New Jersey
 North Broad Street Historic District (Newark, New Jersey), listed on the NRHP in Essex County, New Jersey

New York
 North Broad Street Historic District (Norwich, New York), listed on the NRHP in Chenango County, New York
 Broad Street–Water Street Historic District, Lyons, NY, listed on the NRHP in New York

North Carolina
 South Broad Street Row, Mooresville, NC, a historic district listed on the NRHP in North Carolina
 East Broad Street–Davie Avenue Historic District, Statesville, NC, listed on the NRHP in Iredell County, North Carolina

Ohio
 East Broad Street Historic District (Columbus, Ohio), listed on the NRHP in Ohio

Pennsylvania
 Broad Street Historic District (Philadelphia), listed on the NRHP in Philadelphia, Pennsylvania
 North Broad Street Mansion District, Philadelphia,  listed on the NRHP in Philadelphia, Pennsylvania

South Carolina
 West Broad Street Historic District (Darlington, South Carolina), listed on the NRHP in Darlington County, South Carolina

Virginia
 Broad Street Commercial Historic District (Richmond, Virginia), listed on the NRHP in Richmond, Virginia
 West Broad Street Commercial Historic District, Richmond, VA, listed on the NRHP in Richmond, Virginia

See also 
 Broad Street (ward), a historic district that is one of the 25 wards of London, England
 Broad Street (disambiguation)